is a retelling of the Mazinger Z story by Go Nagai, mixing it with ancient Greek mythology. Here, Greek myths are the human testimony of the epic battles between robots piloted by extraterrestrials. The appearance of the robot remains similar to the original Mazinger, but with a more modern look.

Set in contemporary times, the battle of the Gods (extraterrestrials thought to be Gods by the ancient Greeks) continues. Hades (in mythology, the ruler of the underworld, embodied by Dr. Hell) has returned to attack the Earth and exterminate the human race, and to protect it Zeus sends a robot born from him, Zeta Mazinger.

The robot is given by chance to a student called Koji Kabuto (the classic Mazinger hero) and together with Aphrodite (piloted by Sayaka) and other classic Mazinger characters such as Tetsuya he defends the planet. Many other gods are involved, and their relationships of love and envy are part of the plot.

Some elements of Zeta Mazinger appear in Mazinger Z: The Impact!, the most prominent being the apparition of Zeus in his Zeta Mazinger form.

Manga information

Japanese edition

Italian edition

References

External links
Ζ Mazinger  at the World of Go Nagai website
Ζ Mazinger  at PaTaTo's Manga DB
Ζ Mazinger  at d/visual

Manga series
Adventure anime and manga
Fantasy anime and manga
Mazinger
Shōnen manga
Super robot anime and manga